Bayers Lake Business Park is a business park in Halifax, Nova Scotia west of Clayton Park.

History
The Bayers Lake Industrial Park was developed from the mid-1980s, and was served by CN Rail's Chester Subdivision rail line running from Halifax to Yarmouth as well as Highway 102 and Highway 103. Some of the earliest developments were the Nova Scotia Liquor Commission head office and distribution centre and the Volvo Halifax Assembly, both constructed in 1987.

The industrial park began a transition into a business/retail park in the early 1990s. The first major development occurred when the United States warehouse store chain Price Club (currently a Costco) established a retail store on a westward extension of Lacewood Drive which was called Chain Lake Drive.  Additional big box development followed with the establishment of a Kent Building Supplies, followed by a Kmart (subsequently redeveloped as a Zellers, then a Target, now a Canadian Tire), and an Atlantic Superstore.  The popularity of the new retail outlets at Bayers Lake Industrial Park, or "BLIP" as it was popularly referred to by locals, was apparent.

Further development occurred when Empire Theatres selected Bayers Lake for the establishment of the largest theatre multiplex in Atlantic Canada (17 screens + 1 IMAX); the multiplex is currently operated by Cineplex Entertainment.  The multiplex development led to an expansion in restaurants and other retail outlets.  

The property is administered by the Halifax Regional Municipality.

Transportation
The business park is located at the junction of two major highways; Highway 102 and Highway 103. The park is approximately 10 kilometres from Downtown Halifax. An abandoned Canadian National Railway line runs through the park as a rail trail. The park is also serviced by Halifax Transit buses: 21 Timberlea, 28 Bayers Lake, and 123 Timberlea (rush hour only at St. Margarets Bay Rd and Lakelands Blvd).

Mystery walls
The Bayer's Lake Mystery Walls were discovered several years ago during an expansion of the Bayers Lake Business Park. Extending more than 200 metres and measuring as high as two metres, the stone wall is baffling to many historians.

Tenants
 
Major retailers
Atlantic Superstore
Costco
Kent Building Supplies
Bed Bath and Beyond (formerly Future Shop)
Buy Buy Baby 
Canadian Tire (formerly Kmart, Zellers and Target)
Walmart Supercentre

Minor retailers
 
Best Buy
Bouclair
Canadian Automobile Association
Chapters
Cleve's Source for Sports (formerly Cleve's Warehouse Outlet)
Home Outfitters
Homesense
Kartbahn Racing
Lane Home Furnishings
La-Z-Boy Furniture Gallery
Lee Valley Tools
Mark's Work Warehouse
Marshalls
Michaels
Moores
Nova Scotia Liquor Corporation
Old Navy
Optical Warehouse
PetSmart
Pets Unlimited
Privateers Harley-Davidson
Putting Edge
Racing Around
Sears Appliance & Furniture
Sport Chek
Staples Business Depot
The Brick
The Shoe Company
Value Village
Winners

Restaurants
A&W
Burger King
Boston Pizza
Dairy Queen
East Side Mario's
Harvey's
Kokomos
McDonald's
Jack Astor's
Jungle Jim's Eatery
Montana's
Moxie's
Ela! Greek Taverna (Formerly OPA!)
Pizza Delight
Pizza Pizza (in Scotiabank Theatre)
Pretzelmaker  (in Scotiabank Theatre)
Starbucks (in Chapters)
Subway
Sushi Nami
Swiss Chalet (on Lacewood Drive)
TCBY (in Scotiabank Theatre)
Tim Hortons
Wendy's

Hotels
 Lakeview Inn and Suites
 Comfort Inn

Theatres
 Scotiabank Theatre Halifax with IMAX (formerly Empire Theatres and Cineplex Cinemas)

See also
 Bedford Commons
 Burnside Industrial Park
 Dartmouth Crossing

References

External links

 Bayers Lake Business Park - HRM
 BayersLakePark.com - Comprehensive Bayers Lake Park Directory

Buildings and structures in Halifax, Nova Scotia
Economy of Halifax, Nova Scotia
Power centres (retail) in Canada